The Truce of Malestroit was signed on 19 January 1343 between Edward III of England and Philip VI of France, in the chapelle de la Madeleine in Malestroit. After the signing of this truce, the English sovereign and his troops left Bretagne for England.

Scheduled to last only until 29 September, the truce was short-term; as of February Edward III ordered preparations for embarkation of military forces from Portsmouth. At this point the French king, Philippe VI, put an end to the truce by executing without trial (and despite prior agreements) Olivier IV de Clisson in Paris on 2 August, and then on 29 November a further fourteen Breton lords; Geoffroi de Malestroit, Jean de Montauban, Alain de Quédillac, Denis du Plessis, Guillaume II des Brieux and his brothers Jean and Olivier, and others. These were all supporters of Jean of Montfort. Even so, hostilities did not officially recommence till 1345; they were however pursued till 1362.

Sources 
Georges Bordonove, Les Rois qui ont fait la France - Les Valois - Charles V le Sage, tome 1, éditions Pygmalion, 1988.
Arthur de La Borderie Histoire de la Bretagne réédition Joseph Floch Mayenne (1975), Tome troisième «Rupture de la trêve de Malestroit» p. 481-487.

Bilateral treaties of France
Treaties of England
Treaties of the Hundred Years' War
1343 in Europe
Malestroit
Treaties of the Kingdom of France
Hundred Years' War, 1337–1360
Edward III of England